Chanmari Football Club is an Indian football club based in Aizawl, Mizoram. They are currently competing in Mizoram Premier League, the top level of football in the state of Mizoram. They had also participated in national level competition, 2015 I-League 2nd Division. Their futsal section participates at Futsal Club Championship.

History
Chanmari FC was founded in the year of 2011. In May 2017, they formed a partnership with then Indian Super League club FC Pune City.
As part of the association, FC Pune City has promised to help the Aizawl-based club build a youth structure by providing them with coaches and training equipment. This partnership would enable Chanmari FC to set up youth teams and thereby help local Mizoram players to train and benefit from a young age in professional environment.

Stadiums

Chanmari FC plays its home matches at the Rajiv Gandhi Stadium, located in Salem Veng, Aizawl. It has artificial turf and has a seating capacity of 20,000 spectators. It hosted the home games of them in both the I-League 2nd Division and Mizoram Premier League.

Rivalries

Mizoram derby 
In the regional championships including Mizoram Premier League, the club also nurture rivalries with local sides Chhinga Veng FC, and Aizawl FC.

2018 squad

Honours
Mizoram Premier League
Champions (2): 2013–14, 2016–17
Runners-up (1): 2015–16

See also
List of football clubs in India

References

External links
Chanmari FC at Global Sports Archive
Chanmari FC on Facebook

I-League 2nd Division clubs
Association football clubs established in 2011
Football clubs in Mizoram
2011 establishments in Mizoram
Chanmari FC